James S. Harris is a scientist and engineer and fellow of IEEE, American Physical Society and Optical Society of America. His research primarily deals with optoelectronic devices and semiconductor material research. 

Since 1982, he is the James and Elenor Chesebrough Professor of Electrical Engineering, Applied Physics and Material Science at Stanford University.

Harris was elected a member of the National Academy of Engineering in 2011 for contributions to epitaxial growth of compound semiconductor materials and their applications.

Education 
Harris completed his BS (1964), MS (1965), and PhD (1969) – all in electrical engineering – from Stanford University.

Career 
Prior to joining the Stanford department of Electrical Engineering in 1982, James Harris was with Rockwell International Science Center, where he held various positions from Technical Staff Member to Director Optoelectronics Research.

Research 
Harris’ research interests are in the areas of new electronic and optoelectronic device structures created by heterojunctions, quantum wells, superlattices and nanostructured materials. He has carried out research on novel semiconductor materials and their growth at atomic level dimensions for the past 50 years.

Harris has been issued approximately 37 patents as of this publication (2019).

Awards 
1988 IEEE Fellow
1992 American Physical Society Fellow
2005 Optical Society of America Fellow
2000 IEEE Third Millennium Medal
2000 IEEE Morris N. Liebmann Memorial Award
2009 Materials Research Society Fellow
2011 Member of National Academy of Engineering
2013 Aristotle Award, Semiconductor Research Corp
2014 Alfred Y. Cho MBE Award, International MBE Conference
2023 IEEE Jun-ichi Nishizawa Medal

References 

Living people
Fellows of Optica (society)
Fellow Members of the IEEE
Fellows of the American Physical Society
21st-century American physicists
Stanford University Department of Electrical Engineering faculty
Stanford University School of Engineering faculty
Year of birth missing (living people)